Bloomington Heights is an unincorporated community in McLean County, Illinois. United States.

References

Unincorporated communities in McLean County, Illinois
Unincorporated communities in Illinois